Ado Birk's cabinet was in office in Estonia from 28 July 1920 to 30 July 1920, when it was succeeded by Jaan Tõnisson's second cabinet.

Members

This cabinet's members were the following:

References

Cabinets of Estonia